Carlo Thränhardt (born 5 July 1957) is a retired German high jumper. He excelled at indoor competitions, setting the world indoor record on three occasions between 1984 and 1988. His best mark of 2.42 metres ranks him second on the indoor all-time list one-centimetre behind world record holder Javier Sotomayor of Cuba. The only superior outdoor performances are Sotomayor's world record of 2.45 m, and Mutaz Essa Barshim's clearance of 2.43 m in 2014. Like all modern high jumpers, Thränhardt used the Fosbury Flop style, but of the 16 men in history to have cleared 2.40 m or higher, he was only the second to do so jumping off his right leg. The first was Igor Paklin. At the European Indoor Championships, he won a gold medal in 1983 and four silver medals (1981,84, 86,87). Outdoors, his best championship result was winning a bronze medal at the 1986 European Championships. He also reached the Olympic finals in 1984 and 1988.

He holds the world record in the Masters 55 age group. He set this world record on 24 August 2013 in Eberstadt with 1.90 m. This was an improvement on his former world record of 1.88 m also set in 2013.

Career
Thränhardt was born in Bad Lauchstadt, Saxony-Anhalt. He achieved his personal best performance in outdoor competitions with 2.37 m on 2 September 1984 in Rieti. This result is also the German outdoor record.

Thränhardt was particularly well known for his prowess during the indoor track & field seasons. He set a total of three world indoor records. His first record jump was recorded on February 24, 1984, in the Schöneberger sports hall during which he achieved a mark of 2.37m. On January 16, 1987 in Simmerath, Germany he became the first man to clear 2.40 m indoors. This mark bested his countryman Dietmar Mögenburg's record of 2.39 m set in Cologne, Germany (1985).

On February 26, 1988 he set his last world indoor record of 2.42 m in the Schöneberger sports hall. By this time, the requirement for a roofless arena had recently been stricken from the world record (commonly known as "world outdoor record") rules, so this mark was also recognised as equalling Patrik Sjöberg's world record. It remained a world record until September 1988, when it was beaten by Javier Sotomayor (2.43 m), and a world indoor record until March 1989, when Sotomayor repeated this performance indoors. In 1990, roofs were again banned for world records, and Thränhardt's 2.42 m was retroactively removed from all official outdoor record and performance lists. Although roofs have once again been allowed (from 1998), this record (which would still be a European record shared with Sjöberg, as well as the German record) has not been retroactively reinstated. The second highest jump ever indoors, it remains the European indoor record.

Jumping as a masters athlete, Thränhardt set the M55 World Record at 1.87 m at the Flopfest meet in Eberstadt, Germany.

Carlo Thränhardt was firstly a member of ASV Köln, later moving to LG Bayer Leverkusen. He had a match weight of 85 kg (187 lb) and is 1.99 m (6 ft 6 in) tall.

In 2004 he participated in the RTL version of I'm a Celebrity, Get Me Out of Here!.

National titles
 West German Athletics Championships
High jump: 1986
 West German Indoor Athletics Championships
High jump: 1977, 1978, 1985, 1986, 1987, 1988
 German Indoor Athletics Championships
High jump: 1991

International competitions

References

External links
 

1957 births
Living people
People from Saalekreis
West German male high jumpers
German male high jumpers
German masters athletes
Olympic athletes of West Germany
Athletes (track and field) at the 1984 Summer Olympics
Athletes (track and field) at the 1988 Summer Olympics
World Athletics Championships athletes for West Germany
European Athletics Championships medalists
World record setters in athletics (track and field)
World record holders in masters athletics
ASV Köln athletes
LG Bayer Leverkusen athletes
Ich bin ein Star – Holt mich hier raus! participants
Sportspeople from Saxony-Anhalt